Seregulovo (Sireğol) is a rural locality (a village) and the administrative centre of Baydavletovsky Selsoviet, Zianchurinsky District, Bashkortostan, Russia. The population was 306 as of 2010. There are 4 streets.

Geography 
Seregulovo is located 33 km northeast of Isyangulovo (the district's administrative centre) by road. Sazala is the nearest rural locality.

References 

Rural localities in Zianchurinsky District